Jessica Anstiss (born 20 November 1996) is an Australian netball player in the Suncorp Super Netball league, playing for the West Coast Fever.

Career
Anstiss began her netball career in the West Australian Netball League in 2014, earning several underage national team caps along the way. She earned a position as a replacement player for the West Coast Fever in 2016, before being permanently picked up by the Fever before the 2017 Suncorp Super Netball season. She was selected in the Australian Diamonds squad for the 2018/19 international season. Anstiss was awarded the Young Star Award for her performance in the 2018 season.

References

External links
 Super Netball profile

Australian netball players
West Coast Fever players
Living people
1996 births
Suncorp Super Netball players
Netball players from Western Australia
Western Sting players
Australian Netball League players
West Australian Netball League players